For Beginner Piano is the debut studio album by British electronic band Plone. It was released on Warp in 1999.

Critical reception
John Bush of AllMusic gave the album 4 stars out of 5, calling it "an enjoyable album, especially for those interested in the history of the synthesizer and tape music ('60s pioneers Perrey & Kingsley are probably the best reference point)." Tim Perry of The Independent said, "Plone mix warm electronica with a global sensibility." Ryan Schreiber of Pitchfork gave the album a 5.4 out of 10, saying: "Like so many songs being sold to hip marketing campaigns these days, you can listen to any of For Beginner Pianos ten tracks for hours without ever noticing they're there."

Track listing

Personnel
Credits adapted from liner notes.

 Plone – production
 Frank Arkwright – mastering
 The Designers Republic – design
 Deirdre O'Callaghan – photography

References

External links
 

1999 debut albums
Plone (band) albums
Warp (record label) albums
Matador Records albums